North Carolina Fusion U-23, formerly known as Carolina Dynamo, is an American soccer team based in Greensboro, North Carolina, United States. Founded in 1993, the team plays in USL League Two, the fourth tier of the American Soccer Pyramid.

The team plays its home games at Macpherson Stadium in nearby Browns Summit, North Carolina, where they have played since 2003. The team's colors are white and red.

The team's sister organization,  the U23 NCFusion Women, play in the women's USL W League, and also field a team in the USL's Super-20 League.

History 

The team, which was named Greensboro Dynamo until 1996, was owned by Neil Macpherson, a passionate follower and former shareholder of British football club Nottingham Forest, as can be seen from the similarities between the two clubs' crests.

Rebrand as North Carolina Fusion U-23

Players

Roster
Giovanni Pisello
Emanuele Scroto
Luca Lunghissimo
Mauro Draghi
Gianluca Caciocavallo
Edoardo Pisello
Cosimo Fini
Neymar Jr
Don Bosco
Losco
Nedved
Medvedev
Luca Ferramenta
Giovinco
Jokerinho
Rizzo
Durante Basta Durante Kevin Anll

Year-by-year

Honors

Premier Development League / USL League Two
 Regular Season Champions (1): 2006
 Eastern Conference Champions (1): 2004
 Southern Conference Champions (2): 2021, 2022
 Division Champions (7)
 Mid Atlantic Division  (1): 2004
 South Atlantic Division (7): 2006, 2011, 2012, 2013, 2019, 2021, 2022
 Southeast Division (1): 2007

Others
 USISL Champions (2): 1993, 1994
 USISL Atlantic Division Champions (2): 1993, 1994
 USISL Select League South Atlantic Division Champions (1): 1996
 USL Pro Select/Soccer League Southern Division Champions (1): 2003
 National Amateur Cup (1): 2013

Head coaches 
  Michael Parker (1993–1995)
  Alan Dicks (1996–1997)
  Joe Brown (1999–2000)
  Robert Rosario (2001)
  Joe Brown (2002–2003)
  Carl Fleming (2004)
  Joe Brown (2005–2010)
  Marc Nicholls (2011–2015)
  Tony Falvino (2016–2018)

Stadium 
 UNCG Soccer Stadium; Greensboro, North Carolina (1993–1996)
 A.J. Simeon Stadium; High Point, North Carolina (1996–1999)
 Macpherson Stadium; Browns Summit, North Carolina (2003–present)
 Truist Sports Park; Winston-Salem, North Carolina 3 games (2009–2010)
 Vert Stadium at High Point University; High Point, North Carolina 1 game (2010)
 Truist Point; High Point, North Carolina 3 games (2021–present)

Average attendance 

Attendance stats are calculated by averaging each team's self-reported home attendances from the historical match archive at https://web.archive.org/web/20100105175057/http://www.uslsoccer.com/history/index_E.html.

 1997: 2,605 (10th in A-League)
 2005: 957 (4th in PDL)
 2006: 1,460 (3rd in PDL)
 2007: 2,168 (3rd in PDL)
 2008: 948
 2009: 863
 2010: 1,676 (4th in PDL)

See also 
 Dynamo (disambiguation)

References

External links
 
 Story of the badge from footballcrests.com

 
Association football clubs established in 1993
USL League Two teams
Soccer clubs in North Carolina
USL Second Division teams
A-League (1995–2004) teams
1993 establishments in North Carolina